The following is a list of current Pac-12 Conference members' NCAA and AIAW championships. The Pac-12 was the first conference to win 500 team titles & currently (as of March 27, 2022) Pac-12 members have won 547 NCAA national championships, which is 248 more than the next closest conference, the Big Ten. Since the 1999–2000 academic year, the Pac-12 claims a total of 218 NCAA team titles, including 3 by 1 school in 2019–2020.  They have also led or tied the nation in NCAA Championships in 54 of the last 57 years, including the past 15 years, the only exceptions being in 1980–81, 1988–89, 1990–91 and 1995-96 when the conference finished second, and finished third in 1998-99 and 2004–2005.

This list also includes championships won by current Pac-12 schools while members of the Pacific Coast Conference (PCC), a closely related league that was formed in 1916 and disbanded in 1959. Although the current charter of what is now known as the Pac-12 dates only to the formation of the Athletic Association of Western Universities immediately after the demise of the PCC, the Pac-12 claims the PCC's history as its own. There is considerable continuity between the PCC and Pac-12—eight of the nine final members of the PCC (all except Idaho) are now Pac-12 members; five of these schools had founded the AAWU, and all eight had joined the AAWU by the 1964–65 school year.

Current members

Most recent NCAA championship

* most recent NCAA championship won by a member of the conference

Fall Sports

Men's Sports

* Won while a member of another conference, or an independent.
Oregon State was not initially invited to join the AAWU upon its 1959 formation. It played as an independent until joining the AAWU in 1964.
Colorado won its pre-2013 men's cross country titles as a member of the Big 12 Conference.
Colorado won its 1990 football title (AP) as a member of the Big Eight Conference.

† The NCAA does not officially declare football national championships. Various polls, formulas, and other third-party systems have been used to determine national championships, not all of which are universally accepted. The various polls were often not unanimous, resulting in more than one team sharing a title, and mathematical systems were sometimes applied retroactively to determine championships. Furthermore, schools determined by one or more selectors as champions, do not  necessarily claim the title.

Italics indicate retroactive or minor selector.
USC claims 11 national football championships, California claims 5, Arizona State, Stanford and Washington each claim 2, and Colorado and UCLA each claim 1 championship.

Women's Sports

* Won while a member of another conference.
The conference now known as the Pac-12 did not sponsor women's sports until the 1986–87 school year, when it was known as the Pacific-10 Conference. Oregon won its 1983 women's cross country title as a member of the Northern Pacific Conference, while USC in 1981 and UCLA in 1984 won women's volleyball titles as members of the Western Collegiate Athletic Association.
Colorado won both of its women's cross country championships as a member of the Big 12 Conference.

Winter Sports

Men's Sports

* Won while a member of another conference.
Utah won its 1944 men's basketball title as a member of the Mountain States Conference.

Women's Sports

* Won while a member of another conference.
As noted above, the then-Pac-10 did not sponsor women's sports until 1986–87. Stanford won its 1983 women's swimming and diving championship as a member of the Western Collegiate Athletic Association.
Utah won all of its women's gymnastics championships as a member of the Western Athletic Conference.

Spring Sports

Men's Sports

* Won while a member of another conference.
The NCAA started sponsoring the intercollegiate golf championship in 1939, but it retained the titles from the 41 championships previously conferred by the National Intercollegiate Golf Association in its records. Stanford won one of these pre-NCAA titles in 1938.
Oregon was not initially invited to join the AAWU on its formation in 1959. It won its 1962 and 1964 men's outdoor track and field titles as an independent; it did not join the AAWU until the 1964–65 school year.
All national titles in baseball and men's outdoor track and field won by Arizona and Arizona State prior to the 1978–79 school year were won while the two schools were in the Western Athletic Conference.

Women's Sports

* Won while a member of another conference.
As noted previously, the then-Pac-10 did not sponsor women's sports until 1986–87.
UCLA: Three national championships in softball (1982, 1984, 1985) and two in women's outdoor track and field (1982, 1983) were won as a member of the Western Collegiate Athletic Association (WCAA).
Stanford: Three national championships in women's tennis (1982, 1984, 1986) were won as a member of the WCAA (known as the Pacific West Conference in the 1985–86 school year).
USC: Two national championships in women's tennis (1983, 1985) were won as a member of the WCAA.
Oregon: One national championship in women's track and field (1985) was won as a member of the Northern Pacific Conference.

Other NCAA championships
The following are NCAA championships won by Pac-12 members but in sports not sponsored by the Pac-12

Men's Sports

* Won while a member of another conference.
Both Utah and Colorado were and are members of the Rocky Mountain Intercollegiate Ski Association.
All of Colorado's championships in men's skiing between 1959 and 1982 were won as a full member of the Big Eight Conference, which never sponsored skiing in its history.
Utah's 1981 men's skiing title was won as a full member of the Western Athletic Conference, which like the Pac-12 has never sponsored skiing.

Women's Sports

Combined Sports

* Won while a member of another conference.
Both Utah and Colorado are members of the Rocky Mountain Intercollegiate Ski Association. 
Utah: Championships between 1983 and 1997 won as a full member of the Western Athletic Conference, and 2003 championship won as a full member of the Mountain West Conference. Neither conference has ever sponsored skiing.
Colorado: Championships in 1991 and 1995 won as a full member of the Big Eight Conference, and championships between 1998 and 2011 won as a full member of the Big 12 Conference. The Big Eight never sponsored skiing before its demise in 1996, and the Big 12 has never sponsored the sport.

AIAW national championships 

Mary Budke of Oregon State won the 1974 AIAW individual collegiate golf national championship.

The Utes also won an AIAW title in 1978, bringing their total of national titles to 15 (pending update of 2022 NCAA Skiing Title.

See also

List of NCAA schools with the most NCAA Division I championships
List of NCAA schools with the most Division I national championships
List of NCAA schools with the most AIAW Division I national championships
List of college athletics championship game outcomes
Mythical national championship

References

Pac-12 Conference
Pac-12 Conference